[Pitch.Black.Effects] is the fifth and final studio album by the extreme metal band Callenish Circle.

Track listing
 "This Day You Regret" − 4:32
 "Ignorant" − 4:20
 "Behind Lines" − 3:36
 "Schwarzes Licht" − 4:51
 "Sweet Cyanide" − 4:31
 "Blind" − 4:52
 "Guess Again" − 4:01
 "Self-Inflicted" − 5:50
 "As You Speak" − 4:09
 "Pitch Black" − 2:40

Credits

Callenish Cicle
 Patrick Savelkoul − vocals
 Ronny Tyssen − guitar, mixing
 Remy Dieteren − guitar
 Ralph Roelvink − bass
 Gavin Harte − drums

Additional personnel
 Gail Liebling - producing, keyboards, programming
 Tue Madsen - audio engineering, mixing
 Peter Neuber - mastering
 Mircea Gabriel Eftemie - artwork, design
 Rene Ubachs - additional engineering

2005 albums
Callenish Circle albums